Genjirō, Genjiro or Genjirou (written: 源次郎 or 原二郎) is a masculine Japanese given name. Notable people with the name include:

, Japanese film producer, actor and director
, Japanese politician and governor of Nagasaki Prefecture

Japanese masculine given names